Silje Torp (born Silje Torp Færavaag, 19 October 1974 in Oslo) is a Norwegian actress, author, and trainer.

Biography
Torp attended the Norwegian National Academy of Theatre from 1997 until 2000. Before this, she lived in Italy for three years and went to an art academy in Carrara, where she trained to become a sculptor/stonemason.

She came to international prominence with her role as the shield-maiden Frøya in the television series Norsemen between 2016 and 2020. The series was first shown on the Norwegian public broadcaster NRK, and later on the streaming platform Netflix. Torp was previously known for her role as sheriff Mette Hansen in season two of the series Lilyhammer.

Torp works as a personal fitness trainer.

Publications
In January 2019, she published the book Sterk med strikk (Strong with Elastic) through Cappelen Damm.

Selected filmography

References

External links

 

1974 births
Living people
Actresses from Oslo
Norwegian non-fiction writers
Norwegian women non-fiction writers 
21st-century Norwegian women writers